This is a list of fossiliferous stratigraphic units in Newfoundland and Labrador.

References

 

Newfoundland and Labrador
Geology of Newfoundland and Labrador
fossiliferous stratigraphic units